The Minorities Affairs Department is a department of the Government of Sindh, Pakistan. It was established in the 1995 with the Religious Affairs, Auqaf, Zakat and Ushr Department, but became a separate department in 2010.

The department was created to safeguard the rights of minorities and facilitates in the formulation of policies, planning, coordination, evaluation and review of the regulatory framework.

See also 
 Minorities in Pakistan
 Punjab human rights and minorities affairs department

References

External links
 

Departments of Government of Sindh
Religion in Pakistan